Cysteine-rich protein 1 is a protein that in humans is encoded by the CRIP1 gene.

Cysteine-rich intestinal protein (CRIP) belongs to the LIM/double zinc finger protein family, members of which include cysteine- and glycine-rich protein-1 (CSRP1; MIM 123876), rhombotin-1 (RBTN1; MIM 186921), rhombotin-2 (RBTN2; MIM 180385), and rhombotin-3 (RBTN3; MIM 180386). CRIP may be involved in intestinal zinc transport (Hempe and Cousins, 1991).[supplied by OMIM]

References

External links

Further reading